Lorenz Ritter (24 November 1832 – 3 September 1921) was a German painter and etcher.

Biography
He was born at Nuremberg, and a pupil of Heideloff. He painted chiefly in watercolors and etched numerous architectural views of Nuremberg and some subjects from North Italy. He died in Nuremberg.

Family
His older brother, Paul Ritter, was also a painter.

Notes

References
 

1832 births
1921 deaths
19th-century German painters
19th-century German male artists
German male painters
20th-century German painters
20th-century German male artists
German etchers
Artists from Nuremberg
20th-century German printmakers